Zehaye Bahta (Tigrinya: ጸሃዬባህታ; c. 1932-?) was a former Ethiopian cyclist. He competed in the individual and team road race events at the 1956 Summer Olympics.

Bahta and his friend Mesfen Tesfaye were the first Eritrean natives to compete in the Olympic cycling competition. After his sporting career, he served with the Ethiopian National Defense Force, and later as a merchant.

References

External links
 

Year of birth missing (living people)
Living people
Ethiopian male cyclists
Olympic cyclists of Ethiopia
Cyclists at the 1956 Summer Olympics
Place of birth missing (living people)